npm is a package manager for the JavaScript programming language maintained by npm, Inc. npm is the default package manager for the JavaScript runtime environment Node.js. It consists of a command line client, also called npm, and an online database of public and paid-for private packages, called the npm registry. The registry is accessed via the client, and the available packages can be browsed and searched via the npm website. The package manager and the registry are managed by npm, Inc.

Acronym 
npm is officially a "recursive  bacronymic abbreviation for 'npm is not an acronym.  However, the initial commit of npm referred to it as the "Node Package Manager".  The expansion of the name was changed in 2014.

History 
npm is written entirely in JavaScript and was developed by Isaac Z. Schlueter as a result of having "seen module packaging done terribly" and with inspiration from other similar projects such as PEAR (PHP) and CPAN (Perl).

Notable breakages 
 In March 2016, npm attracted press attention after a package called left-pad, which many popular JavaScript packages depended on, was unpublished as the result of a naming dispute between Azer Koçulu, a self-taught software engineer, and Kik. Although the package was republished three hours later, it caused widespread disruption, leading npm to change its policies regarding unpublishing to prevent a similar event in the future.
 In February 2018, an issue was discovered in version 5.7.0 in which running sudo npm on Linux systems would change the ownership of system files, permanently breaking the operating system.
 In July 2018, the npm credentials of a maintainer of the popular eslint-scope package were compromised resulting in a malicious release of eslint-scope, version 3.7.2. The malicious code copied the npm credentials of the machine running eslint-scope and uploaded them to the attacker.
 In November 2018, it was discovered that a malicious package had been added as a dependency to version 3.3.6 of the popular package event-stream. The malicious package, called flatmap-stream, contained an encrypted payload that stole bitcoins from certain applications. npm administrators removed the offending package.
 In April 2020, a small package called is-promise resulted in outage in serverless applications and deployments worldwide by virtue of being a dependency of many big and important applications.
 In January 2022, the maintainer of the popular package colors pushed changes printing garbage text in an infinite loop. The maintainer also cleared the repository of another popular package, faker, and its package on npm, and replaced it with a README that read, "What really happened to Aaron Swartz?"
 In March 2022, developer Brandon Nozaki Miller released a version of the package node-ipc containing malicious code that would delete files from users with Belarusian and Russian IP addresses, in protest of the Russian invasion of Ukraine. Vue.js, which uses node-ipc as a dependency, did not pin its dependencies to a safe version, meaning that some users of Vue.js became affected by the malicious package if the dependency was fetched as the latest package. The affected dependency was also briefly present in version 3.1 of Unity Hub; a hotfix was released the same day to remove the issue, however.

Description 
npm is included as a recommended feature in the Node.js installer. 
npm consists of a command line client that interacts with a remote registry. It allows users to consume and distribute JavaScript modules that are available in the registry.
Packages in the registry are in CommonJS format and include a metadata file in JSON format.
Over 1.3 million packages are available in the main npm registry. The registry does not have any vetting process for submission, which means that packages found there can potentially be low quality, insecure, or malicious. 
Instead, npm relies on user reports to take down packages if they violate policies by being low quality, insecure, or malicious. npm exposes statistics including number of downloads and number of depending packages to assist developers in judging the quality of packages.

In npm version 6, the audit feature was introduced to help developers identify and fix security vulnerabilities in installed packages. The source of security vulnerabilities were taken from reports found on the Node Security Platform (NSP) and has been integrated with npm since npm's acquisition of NSP.

Usage 
npm can manage packages that are local dependencies of a particular project, as well as globally-installed JavaScript tools.
When used as a dependency manager for a local project, npm can install, in one command, all the dependencies of a project through the package.json file. 
In the package.json file, each dependency can specify a range of valid versions using the semantic versioning scheme, allowing developers to auto-update their packages while at the same time avoiding unwanted breaking changes.
npm also provides version-bumping tools for developers to tag their packages with a particular version. npm also provides the package-lock.json file which has the entry of the exact version used by the project after evaluating semantic versioning in package.json.

Alternatives 
There are a number of open-source alternatives to npm for installing modular JavaScript, including ied, pnpm, npmd, and Yarn, the last of which was released by Facebook in October 2016. They are all compatible with the public npm registry and use it by default, but provide different client-side experiences, usually focused on improving performance and determinism compared to the npm client.

Registry 
Internally npm relies on the NoSQL Couch DB to manage publicly available data.

See also 

 Software repository
 Universal package manager

References

External links

Command-line software
Free package management systems
Free software programmed in JavaScript
JavaScript programming tools
Microsoft free software
Software using the Artistic license
2010 software